Andy Murray defeated the four-time defending champion Novak Djokovic in the final, 6–3, 6–4 to win the singles tennis title at the 2016 ATP World Tour Finals. With the win, Murray attained the year-end No. 1 ranking for the first time. Murray contested the longest three-setter in the tournament's history, 3 hours and 38 minutes, in the semifinals against Milos Raonic, saving a match point, in the process, en route to the title.

Roger Federer, whose season was curtailed by injury, did not qualify for the Tour Finals for the first time since 2001, ending his record streak of 14 consecutive appearances. He fell to world No. 16 in the rankings as a result, ending his streak of 734 consecutive weeks in the world's top 10. Rafael Nadal qualified, but also withdrew due to injury.

Gaël Monfils, Dominic Thiem and David Goffin (as an alternate replacing Monfils) made their debuts in the event.

Seeds

Alternates

Draw

Finals

Group John McEnroe
Standings are determined by: 1. number of wins; 2. number of matches; 3. in two-players-ties, head-to-head records; 4. in three-players-ties, percentage of sets won, then percentage of games won, then head-to-head records; 5. ATP rankings.

Group Ivan Lendl
Standings are determined by: 1. number of wins; 2. number of matches; 3. in two-players-ties, head-to-head records; 4. in three-players-ties, percentage of sets won, then percentage of games won, then head-to-head records; 5. ATP rankings.

References

Main Draw

External links 
Official Website

Singles